The judiciary of Somalilandis the judicial branch of the Somaliland government.

Mandated by the 1997 Constitution, the judiciary is responsible for overseeing and interpreting the law. It comprises the national and district courts as well as the attorney general and his deputies.

A combination of a number of separate legal traditions, the Somaliland legal system is primarily based on traditional Islamic Shariah law. Though there are no official Shariah courts in Somaliland, the state courts uphold Shariah. In addition to Sharia, Somaliland courts also use a form of British colonial law and traditional common law.

History of the Legal System

Pre-Colonization 

Before colonization the territory that is now Somaliland relied on xeer, or traditional tribal law. This law was applied by clan elders in addition to Shariah law applied by Islamic scholars.

British Colonization (1884 – World War II) 

After formally receiving control of Somaliland from Egypt in 1884, British colonizers introduced a British common law based on the legal system they had implemented in colonial India.

As part of Somalia (1960–1991) 

After being joined with the former Italian Somaliland in 1960 to create the new state of Somalia, Somaliland did not have its own independent legal system until its independence. Despite this, the lower courts of the Somaliland region still used British colonial law until 1977.

After Independence (1991 – Today) 

After Somaliland declared its independence from Somalia in 1991, the courts were governed for a short time using Italian practices until fighting in Borama halted all progress. From 1993 to 1997, the Borama Charter mandated the formation of a newly independent judiciary that used pre-1969 laws. Since the ratification of the Somaliland Constitution in 1997 the legal system has consisted of a mix of three legal frameworks, with judges alternatively applying Sharia law, British colonial law, and xeer.

Structure of the Courts 

The five levels of courts in Somaliland are: the Supreme Court, the Appeal Courts of the Regions, the Regional Courts, the District Courts, and the Courts of the National Armed Forces.

Supreme Court 

The Supreme Court of Somaliland is the highest court of the judiciary and consists of a chief judge and at least four other associate judges. The supreme court acts in three different capacities. First it is the final appellate court and as such it can hear cases remanded to it by lower courts concerning all issues of criminal or civil law. In this capacity it also addresses concerns over the validity of national elections. Second, it acts as the constitutional court, addressing issues of constitutional interpretation and application. Finally, in impeachment cases brought against ministers of the government it functions as the High Court of Justice, overseeing the trial and calling for the removal of ministers if found guilty. The High Court of Justice consists of five members of the Supreme Court and four additional members selected two each from the two houses of Parliament.The impeachment process for the President or Vice-President, while overseen by the Chief Justice, is administered by parliament rather than the Supreme Court itself.

Lower Civilian Courts 

The Regional, Regional Appeals, and District Courts are all administered by the Judicial Commission and deal with all manners of civil and criminal law.

Courts of the National Armed Forces 

The Courts of the National Armed Forces hear criminal cases brought against armed forces members during peace or war.

Judicial Commission 

The constitution also mandated the formation of a judicial commission (sometimes called the High Judicial Council), an organization tasked with overseeing the lower civilian courts of Somaliland. This body is in charge of promoting or dismissing judges of the lower courts as well as deputy attorneys general.

Attorney-General 

The Attorney-General of Somaliland is appointed by the President and approved by the House of Representatives. In addition to broadly administering and facilitating justice throughout Somaliland, the Attorney General is responsible for submitting charges against members of the judiciary for removal, prosecuting national legislators accused of crimes, and bringing forth charges against cabinet ministers of the government.

Criticism and Attempts at Reform 

Much criticism has been aimed at the Somaliland judiciary, mainly for its inefficiency and unequal application of the law. In addition, the judiciary is viewed as being too heavily dominated by outside forces, including the Executive and Legislative Branches. One example of this is the President's authority to dismiss Supreme Court judges for virtually no reason, an authority that President Mohamoud used in 2011 when he dismissed eight sitting Supreme Court justices. According to a 2016 study on the state of the Somaliland judiciary, among the primary reasons for the judiciary's inefficiency and lack of independence were a lack of funding, multiple and conflicting laws concerning the judiciary, and an unclear role of the judiciary as defined in the constitution. The Law on the Organization of the Judiciary, which is the most recent substantial attempt at judicial reform, was passed in two different forms in both 2003 and 2008 and since both were technically ratified by both houses of Parliament and approved by the President, they both still govern the judicial system today. These laws contain several contradictory or unclear sections, and though a third law aiming to consolidate the two previous ones is currently being written, it has yet to be put into law.

There have, however, been many attempts at reform, especially since the 2015 appointment of reform-minded Chief Justice Adan Haji Ali Ahmed. From 2012–2016 the Ministry of Justice in Somaliland implemented a four-year training program to train law school graduates for entrance into the judiciary. In addition, there have been numerous NGOs that have produced reports on reform and proposed ideas for how to improve the judiciary.

References 

Government of Somaliland
Law of Somaliland